John R. Hess is an American physician, focusing in blood coagulation, transfusion in trauma and red blood cells, currently at University of Washington.
His research involves both the development of better blood storage systems and hemorrhage control devices and the conduct of large human trials testing better ways to use blood products. He served on the WHO Expert Panel for Blood Transfusion Medicine from 2006‑2012.

Education

BA, General Studies, Washington State University, Pullman, WA, June 1963
MD, University of Washington, Seattle, WA, June 1972
MPH, University of Hawaii at Manoa, Honolulu, HI Dec 1979

References

Year of birth missing (living people)
Living people
University of Washington faculty
American traumatologists
University of Washington School of Medicine alumni
University of Hawaiʻi at Mānoa alumni
Washington State University alumni